Ahakea or Hawaii dogweed (Bobea sandwicensis) is a species of flowering tree in the coffee family, Rubiaceae, that is endemic to Hawaii. It is threatened both by habitat loss and competition from invasive species.

References

External links

sandwicensis
Endemic flora of Hawaii
Biota of Lanai
Biota of Maui
Biota of Molokai
Biota of Oahu
Trees of Hawaii
Taxonomy articles created by Polbot